The 25th Guldbagge Awards ceremony, presented by the Swedish Film Institute, honored the best Swedish films of 1989, and took place on 5 February 1990. The Miracle in Valby directed by Åke Sandgren was presented with the award for Best Film.

Awards
 Best Film: The Miracle in Valby by Åke Sandgren
 Best Director: Åke Sandgren for The Miracle in Valby
 Best Actor: Stellan Skarsgård for Codename Coq Rouge and The Women on the Roof
 Best Actress: Viveka Seldahl for S/Y Joy
 Best Screenplay: Åke Sandgren and Stig Larsson for The Miracle in Valby
 Best Cinematography: Göran Nilsson for Codename Coq Rouge
 Best Foreign Language Film: A World Apart by Chris Menges
 Creative Achievement:
 Stefan Jarl
 Björn Isfält
 Per Åhlin

References

External links
Official website
Guldbaggen on Facebook
Guldbaggen on Twitter
25th Guldbagge Awards at Internet Movie Database

1990 in Swedish cinema
1989 film awards
Guldbagge Awards ceremonies
February 1990 events in Europe
1990s in Stockholm